The Dutch Lions is the Dutch national American Football team. The team represents the Netherlands in international competition and is made up entirely of Dutch national players, typically but not exclusively playing in the AFBN and GFL competitions.

History

The Lions first competed internationally in 1986. After failing to progress further than the first qualification round in 1987 (in Finland) and 1989 (in Germany), they achieved a 3rd-place finish in the 1991 European Championship in Finland. However, after failing to qualify for the tournament in 1993, combined with upheaval at home within the Dutch governing bodies, the Dutch National Team was to face a long absence from international competition.

Nine years after their previous incarnation, the Dutch returned to the international American Football scene in 2002 under the name Dutch Lions, finishing 5th in the 2003 EFAF C Group European Championship in Denmark after losses to Russia and Italy. Two more losses, this time to Switzerland and Norway in the 2007 EFAF C Group European Championship, led to another 5th place. Five years later, under new head coach Winston Ronde, the Lions improved on those results by finishing 3rd in the 2012 EFAF C Group Championship, this time in Austria, with a close loss to Serbia and a win over Russia.

In 2013 and 2014, the Lions played a series of practice games against Poland, Belgium, Czech Republic and Catalonia, losing only the game against Czech Republic in Prague. In 2015, Head Coach Winston Ronde resigned, and was replaced by Reyhan Agaoglu. After an away loss in a practice game against Switzerland, the Dutch Lions succeeded in qualifying for the 2016 European Championship Qualifying Tournament by defeating rivals Belgium in Waalwijk.

The Lions played host to Ireland in their first ever international practice game, again in Waalwijk, in 2016 as a warm up to the upcoming tournament in the United Kingdom. The Lions were comfortably ahead 20-0 when the game was abandoned early in the third quarter due to lightning.

In September 2016 the Dutch Lions travelled to Worcester, United Kingdom to compete in the qualifying tournament for the 2018 European Championship. Despite leading 13-0 at half time, an injury to Quarterback Richard Bouthoorn contributed to a heartbreaking 20-13 loss in the semi-final, thereby ending the dreams of competing in the 2018 finals. The Netherlands bounced back in the bronze medal game to defeat Russia 17-6. The Lions ended the 2016 season by taking a makeshift squad to face Poland in Lublin in an exhibition game, losing comprehensively 42-14.

In August 2017, it was revealed by the Belgian American Football Federation that American Football Bond Nederland had made the decision to put the Dutch Lions programme on hold until 2018. After the resignation of head coach Reyhan Agaoglu, the federation planned to announce a new head coach after the summer of 2017. 

The Dutch Lions have never qualified for the IFAF World Championship.

Most Recent Playing Squad (2016)

Most recent Coaching Staff (2016)

Most recent Support Staff (2016)

All time results

See also
List of American football teams in the Netherlands

References

External links
Dutch National American Football Team Official Website
American Football Bond Nederland Website

Men's national American football teams
American football
American football teams in the Netherlands
1987 establishments in the Netherlands
American football teams established in 1987